Thomas Farquhar (January 28, 1875 – December 24, 1962) was a Canadian politician and businessman from northern Ontario. Farquhar served in municipal politics in Sault Ste. Marie, Ontario becoming the city’s seventh mayor from 1920 to 1922. He represented Manitoulin in the Legislative Assembly of Ontario from 1926 to 1929 and represented the federal riding of Algoma East in the House of Commons from 1943 to 1948.

In 1948, Farquhar accepted an appointment to the Senate. The subsequent by-election allowed Prime Minister William Lyon Mackenzie King’s Minister of External Affairs, and future Prime Minister Lester B. Pearson the opportunity to be elected to the House of Commons.

In 1945 Farquhar founded a family-owned dairy on Manitoulin Island that today operates as Farquhar’s Dairy Limited.

Life and early work 

Farquhar was the third of ten children of William and Jane Farquhar. He was born on a farm in Barrie, Ontario (then in Simcoe County, Ontario) in 1875. In 1877 the family moved to a farm near Kagawong on Manitoulin Island where Farquhar was educated. In 1896, he traveled west to British Columbia's Slocan Valley where he mined several claims and became a prominent member of the Western Federation of Miners, serving one year as president of the union.

In 1903, Farquhar returned to Manitoulin to take up the family farm. Five years later he moved to Sault Ste. Marie to work at his father's meat business. After a stint in real estate, he and a partner purchased the Star Clothing Company at Queen and Gore Streets where he became a successful merchant.

In June 1905, he married Kathleen Wiber who died six months later. He married his second wife, Florence Amy Wiber in October 1914.

Political career 
Farquhar was active in Sault Ste. Marie politics. After serving as secretary-treasurer of the public school board from 1915 to 1916, he won a seat as city alderman by acclamation in 1918 and was elected in 1919.

Local labour leaders persuaded Farquhar to run for mayor in 1920. He defeated then-mayor George Boyd, and was re-elected with a large plurality in 1921. He was renominated for the office in 1922 but declined to run against Boyd and James Dawson.

Farquhar was a candidate for the Progressive Party in Algoma West in the 1921 federal election but finished third with 27 per cent of the vote.

In 1922 he sold his clothing business to purchase a farm in Mindemoya on Manitoulin. From 1922 to 1925, Farquhar served as the reeve of Carnarvon Township.

He then entered provincial politics and represented Manitoulin in the Legislative Assembly of Ontario from 1926 to 1929 as a United Farmers member. He ran for re-election in 1929 as a Liberal but was defeated. On 14 October 1935, he was elected to the House of Commons under the Liberal banner, representing the riding of Algoma East. He was subsequently re-elected on 26 March 1940 and 11 June 1945.

Prime Minister William Lyon Mackenzie King appointed Farquhar to the Senate on 10 September 1948 so that his new Minister of External Affairs Lester B. Pearson could contest the by-election in Algoma East and enter the House of Commons.  In 1955 he sponsored legislation in the Senate to create the St. Mary's River Bridge Company to facilitate the eventual construction of the International Bridge between Sault Ste. Marie, Ontario and Sault Ste. Marie, Michigan. In 1960, Farquhar suffered a severe stroke and resigned from the Senate on 27 September 1962.

Later work 
In 1935, Farquhar went into the dairy business, eventually buying the dairy in Little Current. Farquhar's Dairy continues to operate as an independent dairy company in Northeastern Ontario. In 1945, he and his sons founded Thos. Farquhar & Sons Co. Limited.  He was also a director for a mine in Gatineau, Quebec.

Death and memorials 
Farquhar died on 24 December 1962 at the age of 87 and was interred in Mindemoya on Manitoulin Island. His wife, Amy died in November 1964. Both are memorialized in a stained glass window at Little Current United Church, in Little Current, Ontario.

His son Stanley later served in the Ontario legislature.

References

 Sault Star, 27 December 1921, page 1
 Canadian Parliamentary Guide, 1928, AL Normandin

External links
 
 

1875 births
1962 deaths
United Farmers of Ontario MLAs
Canadian senators from Ontario
Members of the House of Commons of Canada from Ontario
Liberal Party of Canada MPs
Liberal Party of Canada senators
Mayors of Sault Ste. Marie, Ontario
People from Barrie